Bothropoma pilula is a species of sea snail, a marine gastropod mollusk in the family Colloniidae.

Description
The shell grows to a size of 5 mm.

Distribution
This marine species occurs off South Japan, China and the Philippines. It has also been recorded in the Red Sea.

References

 Dudgeon, D.; Morton, B. (1982). The coral associated Mollusca of Tolo Harbour and Channel, Hong Kong. In: Morton B, editor. Proceedings of the first international marine biological workshop: The marine flora and fauna of Hong Kong and southern China. Hong Kong University Press, Hong Kong. 2: 627–650.
 Bosch D.T., Dance S.P., Moolenbeek R.G. & Oliver P.G. (1995) Seashells of eastern Arabia. Dubai: Motivate Publishing. 296 pp
 Zuschin, M., Janssen, R. & Baal, C. (2009). Gastropods and their habitats from the northern Red Sea (Egypt: Safaga). Part 1: Patellogastropoda, Vetigastropoda and Cycloneritimorpha. Annalen des Naturhistorischen Museums in Wien 111[A]: 73–158. page(s): 106

External links
 

Colloniidae
Gastropods described in 1860